Rel J. Dowdell is an American screenwriter, film director, film producer, and English/film studies/screenwriting educator. Born and raised in Philadelphia, he received his bachelor's degree in English with magna cum laude honors from Fisk University and his advanced degree in film and screenwriting with highest distinction from Boston University. He won the top prize in filmmaking at Boston University's noted Redstone Film Festival in 1995. He is also a full-time university professor of English and Film Studies and is a film historian.

Dowdell's first feature film, Train Ride, received substantial critical acclaim. Produced with independent financing, the film was acquired and distributed by Sony Pictures in 2005 and was a tremendous financial success. Train Ride was ranked as one of the best American films that year as cited by veteran film critic Gerald Peary of The Boston Phoenix. The film also garnered high praise in film historian and writer Irv Slifkin's best-selling book, Filmadelphia: A Celebration of a City's Movies.  Train Ride also won the honor of "Best Feature" at the American Theatre of Harlem Film festival in 2005. In addition, the film featured the last performance of acclaimed veteran actress Esther Rolle. The film also starred Wood Harris, Russell Hornsby, Nicole Prescott, and the late, celebrated hip-hop artist Guru.

Veteran film critic Gerald Peary of The Boston Phoenix compared Dowdell to John Singleton and Spike Lee in the way that his filmmaking blends urban storytelling and suspense to tackle relevant and universal social issues that are intimately intertwined with a powerful moral message.

Dowdell's next feature film effort as writer and director was a drama entitled Changing the Game, which was shot in Philadelphia in the summer of 2010 and theatrically released in May 2012. The film stars Sean Riggs, Irma P. Hall, Dennis L.A. White, Brandon Ruckdashel, and Mari White. There were special appearances by the late, acclaimed actress Suzzanne Douglas, noted hip hop artist Sticky Fingaz, and Tony Todd. The film was cited by FilmFresh.com as one of the top three African-American films of 2012.

Dowdell's third feature film effort is a feature-length documentary entitled, Where's Daddy?, which was shot in Philadelphia in the winter of 2017 and was released in February 2018. The film examines perspectives on the child support system and the specific effect and consequences to African-American families, with emphasis on the experience of fathers as participants in the system. Some of the subjects in the film include hip hop artist Freeway and former Philadelphia Eagles Pro Bowl wide receiver Fred Barnett. The film has a 100% critics rating on Rotten Tomatoes.

References

External links
 Changing the Game review by Kam Williams
 Changing the Game review by Avi Offer, NYC Movie Guru
 Changing the Game review by JC  Macek, World's Greatest Critic

 Where's Daddy? story by Samantha Melamed of The Philadelphia Inquirer
 Where's Daddy? story by Kimberly C. Roberts of The Philadelphia Tribune
 '' Blackfilm.com coverage of release of trailer for "Where's Daddy?"
  Shadow and Act's coverage of release of trailer for "Where's Daddy?
 ''World's Greatest Critic.com's early review of "Where's Daddy?"

Living people
American male screenwriters
American film directors
Film producers from Pennsylvania
Central High School (Philadelphia) alumni
Fisk University alumni
Boston University College of Communication alumni
Writers from Philadelphia
Year of birth missing (living people)
Screenwriters from Pennsylvania